Thomas Price (2 December 1911 – 26 December 1997) was a British speedway rider. In 1949 he won the first Speedway World Championship to be held after the Second World War.

Career

Born in Cambridge, England in 1911, Price's early education was at Perse School and later, at the Cambridge and County High School.

Price started his career with the Wembley Lions in 1935 after only a handful of appearances for Harringay Reserves in the previous season. In 1936 he was loaned out to Cardiff and Nottingham. Within three years he had qualified for his first World Final.

After the war, Price rejoined the Lions and spent a further eleven seasons at the club until he retired in 1956. During that he was a member of the teams that won the National League Championship seven times, and the National Trophy twice.

Price was selected to ride for England in the Ashes series against Australia, but never toured overseas during the winter.

Following his retirement, Tommy opened a small engineering workshop in Wembley, North London where he was able to produce small quantities of specialist items for riders. Often these would have been economically non-viable for larger companies and Tommy was seen as a saviour by many a 'Rocker' of the day.  Speedway faced a crisis at the end of the 1963 season when Southampton closed, due to the stadium being sold for redevelopment.  Realising that the then senior National League could not continue to operate with just 6 teams, Lord Shawcross was appointed to lead an enquiry into the running of the sport.  It was decided amongst senior promoters that a seventh team was vital to the continuance of the sport at a senior level, and it was decided that West Ham was ripe for a re-opening.  After lengthy discussions and a large cash injection funded by the promoters of other National League teams, West Ham reopened after 9 years with Tommy Price at the helm as both promoter and team manager.  Price continued in the role until the end of the 1965 season when he led West Ham to a unique treble, winning the British League, the KO Cup and the London Cup.

After retiring Price moved to Perth, Australia with his wife Margaret. He has a daughter, Melanie, and grandchildren, Simon, Felicity and Sebastian. He died on 26 December 1997 in Perth.

World final appearances
 1938 –  London, Wembley Stadium – 13th – 8pts
 1949 –  London, Wembley Stadium – Winner – 15pts
 1950 –  London, Wembley Stadium – 5th – 8pts
 1954 –  London, Wembley Stadium – 11th – 5pts

References

Further reading 
Tommy Price's Speedway Mixture: Illustrated fact and fiction annual, 1950, Atomic P

1911 births
1997 deaths
British speedway riders
English motorcycle racers
Individual Speedway World Champions
Wembley Lions riders
Sportspeople from Cambridge
People educated at The Perse School
English emigrants to Australia